Emeline Lucy Meaker (sometimes reported as Lucy Emeline Meaker) (June 1838 – March 30, 1883) was the first woman who was legally executed by Vermont.  In 1883, Meaker was convicted of and hanged for the murder of her husband's niece Alice in Duxbury, Vermont.

The crime
Sometime in the spring of 1879, a child welfare worker approached Meaker and her husband to ask if they would consider taking Mr. Meaker's eight-year-old niece, Alice and her brother, Henry, into their home, as the children were living in an overcrowded orphanage. Emeline Meaker was not pleased with the arrangement and beat, starved, and otherwise mistreated Alice.

Meaker decided to kill Alice, and ordered her son Almon to get a lethal dose of strychnine from an apothecary. On April 23, 1880, Meaker and Almon seized Alice, placed a sack over the girl's head, and took her to a remote area outside Waterbury, Vermont, near what is now Little River State Park. When they arrived at a clearing by a stream, Almon handed the poison to his mother and she poured it into a drink which she gave to Alice. While Alice thrashed about in reaction to the strychnine poisoning, Meaker forcibly held her hand over Alice's mouth to keep the girl from crying out, keeping it there until Alice was dead, and then Almon and his mother buried Alice's body.

Investigation and trial
Alice's disappearance was investigated, and Almon confessed to the local sheriff.  At trial, both he and Emeline were sentenced to death; however, Almon's sentence was commuted by the Vermont Legislature because it was believed that he was dominated by his mother. Almon's confession was published in the newspaper on the date set for Emeline's execution. It was reported that Emeline acted violently while in jail, but calmed as her execution date drew nearer.

Execution
On March 30, 1883, the morning of her scheduled execution, Meaker ate a large beefsteak, three potatoes, a slice of bread and butter, a piece of meat pie, and a cup of coffee. Then, at her request, she went to view the gallows, remarking that it was not half as bad as she thought it would be. She sent a message to her husband through the sheriff, and then ate a lunch consisting of two boiled eggs, two slices of toast, one potato, one doughnut, and a cup of coffee.

Over 125 spectators gathered in the prison guardroom at the Vermont State Prison in Windsor County, and it was reported that the sheriff was besieged with requests for passes to witness the hanging.  When Meaker was finally led to the gallows, and asked (by slip of paper as she was deaf) if she had anything to say, Emeline said in a low voice, “May God forgive you all for hanging me, an innocent woman. I am as innocent as that man standing here,” indicating a deputy. None of her family was present at the execution and her husband and children did not accept her body for burial after the execution.

References

1880 murders in the United States
1838 births
1883 deaths
19th-century executions by the United States
19th-century executions of American people
American female murderers
American murderers of children
American people executed for murder
executed American women
people convicted of murder by Vermont
people executed by Vermont by hanging
people from Burlington, Vermont
poisoners
American deaf people